Robert M. Citino (born June 19, 1958) is an American military historian and the Samuel Zemurray Stone Senior Historian at the National WWII Museum. He is a leading authority on modern German military history, with an emphasis upon World War II and the German influence upon modern operational doctrine.

Citino received recognition for his works from the American Historical Association, the Society for Military History, and the New York Military Affairs Symposium. The Historically Speaking journal described him as "one of the most perceptive military historians writing today".

Early life and education
Citino was born and grew up in Cleveland, Ohio. His father was a United States Army veteran of the Pacific War who served in the Guadalcanal Campaign as a combat medic and gave Citino a copy of Guadalcanal Diary by Richard Tregaskis.

After graduating magna cum laude with his Bachelor of Arts in history from Ohio State University in 1978, he earned his Master of Arts and Doctor of Philosophy from Indiana University in 1980 and 1984. Citino is fluent in German, having first learned it as an undergraduate, and is a prolific reader of early 20th-century German military literature.

Career
Citino has held academic postings at the University of North Texas, Lake Erie College, Eastern Michigan University, United States Military Academy at West Point, and the United States Army War College.

He is a fellow of the Barsanti Military History Center, a trustee of the Society for Military History, and a consultant for the White House staff. He has also appeared as a consultant on the History Channel.

He currently chairs the Historical Advisory Subcommittee of the Department of the Army.

Wehrmacht history
Throughout his career Citino has advocated changing the current nomenclature of German military tactics.  Although he uses the word Blitzkrieg on the cover of his books, he has always espoused the view that it should be called by its proper German military term, Bewegungskrieg, or manoeuvre warfare. Citino has taught courses on Nazi Germany and American military history, including Korea, Vietnam, and the Cold War.

On March 15, 2013, Citino was awarded the 2013 Distinguished Book Award by the Society for Military History for his work The Wehrmacht Retreats: Fighting a Lost War, 1943. The book explores German losses in key campaigns in 1943—losses which would eventually lead to an erosion of the German military's strategic advantage. It is his second Distinguished Book Award; he previously received one in 2004 for his book Blitzkrieg to Desert Storm. Citino was a visiting professor at the United States Army War College in Carlisle, Pennsylvania for the 2013–14 academic school year.

Awards 
 Winner of the 2004 Paul M. Birdsall Prize for Best Book in Strategic Studies, American Historical Association for Blitzkrieg to Desert Storm: The Evolution of Operational Warfare
 Winner of the 2005 Distinguished Book Award, Society for Military History for Blitzkrieg to Desert Storm: The Evolution of Operational Warfare
 Winner of the 2012 Arthur Goodzeit Award New York Military Affairs Symposium for The Wehrmacht Retreats: Fighting a Lost War, 1943
 Winner of the 2013 Distinguished Book Award, Society for Military History for The Wehrmacht Retreats: Fighting a Lost War, 1943

Works 
 Citino (1991). Germany and the Union of South Africa in the Nazi Period. Greenwood Press.
 Citino (1994). Armored Forces: History and Sourcebook. Greenwood Press.
 Citino (1999). The Path to Blitzkrieg: Doctrine and Training in the German Army, 1920–1939. Lynne Rienner; Stackpole Books (paperback, 2008)
 Citino (2000). Was the Reputation of the Wehrmacht for Military Superiority Deserved? In History in Dispute 4, World War II, 1939–1945 Detroit: St. James Press.
 Citino (2001). The Weimar Roots of German Military Planning. In Military Planning and the Origins of the Second World War in Europe. edited by B.J.C. McKercher and Roch Legault. Westport, Conn.: Praeger.
 Citino (2002). Quest for Decisive Victory: From Stalemate to Blitzkrieg in Europe, 1899–1940. University Press of Kansas.
 Citino (2004). Blitzkrieg to Desert Storm: The Evolution of Operational Warfare. University Press of Kansas. 
 Citino (2005). The German Way of War: From the Thirty Years' War to the Third Reich. University Press of Kansas.  
 Citino (2007). The Death of the Wehrmacht: The German Campaigns of 1942. University Press of Kansas.  
 Citino (2007). Military Histories Past and Present: A Reintroduction. American Historical Review  vol.112 no.4
 Citino (2012). The Wehrmacht Retreats: The Campaigns of 1943. University Press of Kansas.  
 Citino (2017). The Wehrmacht's Last Stand: The German Campaigns of 1944–1945. University Press of Kansas.

Notes

Sources

External links 
 "Death of the Wehrmacht" – 2009 article by Citino at Historynet.com
 Fritz on Citino, 'Death of the Wehrmacht: The German Campaigns of 1942' – Review by the historian Stephen G. Fritz on H-Net
 'Death of the Wehrmacht: The German Campaigns of 1942'  – Review by Richard L. Dinardo of Marine Corps Command and Staff College
 Interview with Professor Robert Citino, via WW2History.com, a web site by the historian Laurence Rees

Videos

 , via the official channel of the U.S. Army Heritage and Education Center
 , via the official channel of The National WWII Museum; session by Citino and the historian Jonathan Parshall at the 2013 International Conference on World War II
 , via the official channel of the U.S. Army Heritage and Education Center
 , via the official channel of the Center for Strategic and International Studies

1958 births
Living people
Historians of Nazism
American military historians
American male non-fiction writers
Writers from Cleveland
Ohio State University College of Arts and Sciences alumni
Indiana University alumni
Historians from Ohio